Tommaso Tomassoni, O.P. (1616 – October 1654) was a Roman Catholic prelate who served as Bishop of Umbriatico (1652–1654).

Biography
Tommaso Tomassoni was born in Rome, Italy in 1616 and ordained a priest in the Order of Preachers.
On 8 January 1652, he was appointed during the papacy of Pope Innocent X as Bishop of Umbriatico.
On 21 January 1652, he was consecrated bishop by Marcantonio Franciotti, Cardinal-Priest of Santa Maria della Pace, with Ranuccio Scotti Douglas, Bishop Emeritus of Borgo San Donnino, and Patrizio Donati, Bishop Emeritus of Minori, serving as co-consecrators. 
He served as Bishop of Umbriatico until his death in October 1654.
While bishop, he was the principal co-consecrator of Francesco Gozzadini, Bishop of Cefalonia e Zante (1654).

References

External links and additional sources
 (for Chronology of Bishops) 
 (for Chronology of Bishops) 

17th-century Italian Roman Catholic bishops
Bishops appointed by Pope Innocent X
1616 births
1654 deaths
Dominican bishops